The following is a list of cities in Benin according to the 2013 census:

List

Largest cities
Cotonou - 679,012
Porto-Novo - 264,320
Parakou - 255,478
Abomey - 117,824
Djougou - 94,773
Bohicon - 93,744
Kandi - 56,043
Natitingou - 53,284
Ouidah - 47,616
Lokossa - 47,247

Alphabetical list
Abomey
Abomey-Calavi
Athiémè
Banikoara
Bassila
Bembèrèkè
Bétérou
Bohicon
Bori
Boukoumbé
Comè
Cotonou
Cové
Dassa-Zoumé
Djougou
Dogbo-Tota
Founougo
Ganvie
Godomey
Grand-Popo
Guénè
Kandi
Kérou
Kétou
Kouandé
Lokossa
Malanville
Natitingou
Ndali
Nikki
Ouidah
Parakou
Péhonko
Pobè
Porga
Sakété
Sam
Savalou
Savé
Ségbana
Tanguiéta
Tchaourou
Toura

References

External links

 
Benin, List of cities in
Benin
Cities